The Prince Eugen Medal is a medal conferred by the King of Sweden for "outstanding artistic achievement".

The medal was established in 1945 by the then King of Sweden, Gustaf V, in connection with the eightieth birthday of his brother Prince Eugen who was a noted painter and art collector.

It is awarded every year on 5 November, the name day of Eugen, and presented to the winners at the Royal Palace in Stockholm.

Medallists
The following people have received the Prince Eugen Medal since its inception.
Winners are Swedish unless denoted otherwise.

Architects

Painters

Graphic Artists

Sculptors

Artisans

Photographers

Draftsmen

Designers

See also
Orders, decorations, and medals of Sweden
List of European art awards
Prizes named after people

References

External links
 List of recipients (1945–2007)

1945 establishments in Sweden
Visual arts awards
Awards established in 1945
Orders, decorations, and medals of Sweden